Swift was a British weekly comics magazine published by in the UK as a junior companion to the Eagle.

Publication history 
It was founded by the Rev. Marcus Morris and launched by Hulton Press in 1954. After Hultons were sold to Odhams Press in 1959, Swift absorbed Odhams' weekly title Zip and inherited a number of its strips. Swift was merged into the Eagle in 1963.

Comics published in Swift

Arty and Crafty by Geoffrey Bond and Martin Aitchison
Calling U for Useless by Reg Parlett
The Fleet Family, drawn by Frank Bellamy, 1954
The Further Adventures of Robinson Crusoe, classic novel adaptation drawn by Richard Jennings
Ginger and Co, drawn by Neville Colvin, 1960-62
King Arthur and His Knights, by Clifford Makins and Frank Bellamy, 1955-56
Lochinvar’s Ride, illustrated by D. C. Eyles
Nigel Tawney, Explorer, drawn by Harry Winslade (as Redvers Blake)
Paul English, drawn by Frank Bellamy, Giorgio Bellavitis 1955
The Phantom Patrol, drawn by Gerry Embleton (later reprinted as The Ghost Patrol in Smash! in 1966)
The Prisoner of Zenda, classic novel adaptation drawn by Patrick Nicolle, 1961
The Red Rider, drawn by Jim Holdaway
Robin Hood and His Merry Men, by Clifford Makins and Frank Bellamy, 1956-57
Robin Hood and Maid Marian, by Clifford Makins and Frank Bellamy, 1957
Sir Boldasbrass by John Ryan
Smiley, about a young Australian boy, written by Moore Raymond
Swiss Family Robinson, classic novel adaptation drawn by Frank Bellamy, 1954-55
Tammy the Sheepdog, drawn by G. William Backhouse
Tarna the Jungle Boy, drawn by Harry Bishop, 1954-63
Tom Tex and Pinto, western drawn by Harry Bishop, 1954-55

Archival holdings
The British Library holds copies of Swift from 20 March 1954 to 2 March 1963.

References

Citations

Sources 
 

Comics magazines published in the United Kingdom
Children's magazines published in the United Kingdom
Defunct British comics
1954 comics debuts
1963 comics endings
Magazines established in 1954
Magazines disestablished in 1963
Odhams Press titles